Danabek Suzhanov is an amateur boxer. His club is School of Boxing in Oskemen.

Coached by Vladimir Rechitskiy he represented Kazakhstan in the 2012 Summer Olympics taking place in London in the Middleweight Division. In the Round of 32 he lost to Vijender Singh of India 10-14.

Achievements
 2012 – Republic of Kazakhstan President's Cup (Almaty, KAZ) 1st place – 75 kg
 2012 – Chemistry Cup (Halle, GER) 3rd place – 75 kg
 2012 – International Team Tournament (Almaty, KAZ) 2nd place – 75 kg
 2011 – Makar Mazay Memorial Tournament (Mariupol, UKR) 3rd place – 75 kg
 2011 – Nurmagambetov Tournament (Almaty, KAZ) 3rd place – 75 kg
 2011 – Gagik Tsarukyan Memorial Tournament (Yerevan, ARM) 3rd place – 75 kg
 2011 – Great Silk Way Tournament (Baku, AZE) 2nd place – 75 kg
 2011 – Kazakh National Championships 1st place – 75 kg
 2010 – Asian Games (Guangzhou, CHN) 3rd place – 75 kg
 2010 – Republic of Kazakhstan President’s Cup (Astana, KAZ) 2nd place – 75 kg
 2010 – Grand Prix Usti nad Labem (Usti nad Labem, CZE) 2nd place – 75 kg
 2010 – Kazakh National Championships 1st place – 75 kg 
 2009 – Ahmet Comert Tournament (Istanbul, TUR) 3rd place – 75 kg

References

1984 births
Living people
Boxers at the 2012 Summer Olympics
Olympic boxers of Kazakhstan
Asian Games medalists in boxing
Boxers at the 2010 Asian Games
Kazakhstani male boxers
Asian Games bronze medalists for Kazakhstan
Medalists at the 2010 Asian Games
Middleweight boxers
21st-century Kazakhstani people